Energy recovery ventilation (ERV) is the energy recovery process in residential and commercial HVAC systems that exchanges the energy contained in normally exhausted air of a building or conditioned space, using it to treat (precondition) the incoming outdoor ventilation air. The specific equipment involved may be called an Energy Recovery Ventilator, also abbreviated ERV.

During the warmer seasons, an ERV system pre-cools and dehumidifies; during cooler seasons the system humidifies and pre-heats.  An ERV system helps HVAC design meet ventilation and energy standards (e.g., ASHRAE), improves indoor air quality and reduces total HVAC equipment capacity, thereby reducing energy consumption.

ERV systems enable an HVAC system to maintain a 40-50% indoor relative humidity, essentially in all conditions.  ERV's must use power for a blower to overcome the pressure drop in the system, hence incurring a slight energy demand.

Importance 
Nearly half of global energy is used in buildings, and half of heating/cooling cost is caused by ventilation when it is done by the "open window" method  according to the regulations. Secondly, energy generation and grid is made to meet the peak demand of power. To use proper ventilation; recovery is a cost-efficient, sustainable and quick way to reduce global energy consumption and give better indoor air quality (IAQ) and protect buildings, and environment.

Methods of transfer 
An ERV is a type of air-to-air heat exchanger that transfers sensible heat as well as latent heat. Because both temperature and moisture are transferred, ERVs are described as total enthalpic devices.  In contrast, a heat recovery ventilator (HRV) can only transfer sensible heat. HRVs can be considered sensible only devices because they only exchange sensible heat.  In other words, all ERVs are HRVs, but not all HRVs are ERVs. It is incorrect to use the terms HRV, AAHX (air-to-air heat exchanger), and ERV interchangeably.

During the cooling season, the system works to cool and dehumidify the incoming, outside air. To do this, the system takes the rejected heat and sends it into the exhaust airstream.  Subsequently, this air cools the condenser coil at a lower temperature than if the rejected heat had not entered the exhaust airstream.  During the heating seasons, the system works in reverse.  Instead of discharging the heat into the exhaust airstream, the system draws heat from the exhaust airstream in order to pre-heat the incoming air.  At this stage, the air passes through a primary unit and then into the space being conditioned.  With this type of system, it is normal during the cooling seasons for the exhaust air to be cooler than the ventilation air and, during the heating seasons, warmer than the ventilation air.  It is for this reason the system works efficiently and effectively. The coefficient of performance (COP) will increase as the conditions become more extreme (i.e., more hot and humid for cooling and colder for heating).

Efficiency 
The efficiency of an ERV system is the ratio of energy transferred between the two air streams compared with the total energy transported through the heat exchanger.

With the variety of products on the market, efficiency will vary as well.  Some of these systems have been known to have heat exchange efficiencies as high as 70-80% while others have as low as 50%.  Even though this lower figure is preferable to the basic HVAC system, it is not up to par with the rest of its class.  Studies are being done to increase the heat transfer efficiency to 90%.

The use of modern low-cost gas-phase heat exchanger technology will allow for significant improvements in efficiency.  The use of high conductivity porous material is believed to produce an exchange effectiveness in excess of 90%.  By exceeding a 90% effective rate, an improvement of up to five factors in energy loss can be seen.

The Home Ventilating Institute (HVI) has developed a standard test for any and all units manufactured within the United States.  Regardless, not all have been tested.  It is imperative to investigate efficiency claims, comparing data produced by HVI as well as that produced by the manufacturer. (Note: all units sold in Canada are placed through the R-2000 program, a standard test synonymous to the HVI test).

Types of energy recovery devices 

**Total energy exchange only available on hygroscopic units and condensate return units

Rotary air-to-air enthalpy wheel 

The rotating wheel heat exchanger is a rotating cylinder filled with an air permeable material, typically polymer, aluminum, or synthetic fiber, providing the large surface area required for the sensible enthalpy transfer. (Enthalpy is a measure of heat.) As the wheel rotates between the supply and exhaust air streams it picks up heat energy and releases it into the colder air stream. The driving force behind the exchange is the difference in temperatures between the opposing air streams (the thermal gradient).

The enthalpy exchange is accomplished through the use of desiccants.  Desiccants transfer moisture through the process of adsorption which is predominately driven by the difference in the partial pressure of vapor within the opposing air-streams.  Typical desiccants consist of silica gel, and molecular sieves.

Enthalpy wheels are the most effective devices to transfer both latent and sensible heat energy. Choice of construction materials for the rotor, most commonly polymer, aluminum, or fiberglass, determines durability.

When using rotary energy recovery devices the two air streams must be adjacent to one another to allow for the local transfer of energy.  Also, there should be special considerations paid in colder climates to avoid wheel frosting. Systems can avoid frosting by modulating wheel speed, preheating the air, or stop/jogging the system.

Plate heat exchanger 

Fixed plate heat exchangers have no moving parts, and consist of alternating layers of plates that are separated and sealed. Typical flow is cross current and since the majority of plates are solid and non permeable, sensible only transfer is the result.

The tempering of incoming fresh air is done by a heat or energy recovery core.  In this case, the core is made of aluminum or plastic plates.  Humidity levels are adjusted through the transferring of water vapor.  This is done with a rotating wheel either containing a desiccant material or permeable plates.

Enthalpy plates were introduced in 2006 by Paul, a special company for ventilation systems for passive houses. A crosscurrent countercurrent air-to-air heat exchanger built with a humidity permeable material.  Polymer fixed-plate countercurrent energy recovery ventilators were introduced in 1998 by Building Performance Equipment (BPE), a residential, commercial, and industrial air-to-air energy recovery manufacturer.  These heat exchangers can be both introduced as a retrofit for increased energy savings and fresh air as well as an alternative to new construction.  In new construction situations, energy recovery will effectively reduce the required heating/cooling capacity of the system.  The percentage of the total energy saved will depend on the efficiency of the device (up to 90% sensible) and the latitude of the building.

Due to the need to use multiple sections, fixed plate energy exchangers are often associated with high pressure drop and larger footprints.  Due to their inability to offer a high amount of latent energy transfer these systems also have a high chance for frosting in colder climates.

The technology patented by Finnish company RecyclingEnergy Int. Corp. is based on a regenerative plate heat exchanger taking advantage of humidity of air by cyclical condensation and evaporation, e.g. latent heat, enabling not only high annual thermal efficiency but also microbe-free plates due to self-cleaning/washing method. Therefore the unit is called an enthalpy recovery ventilator rather than heat or energy recovery ventilator.  Company´s patented LatentHeatPump is based on its enthalpy recovery ventilator having COP of 33 in the summer and 15 in the winter.

References

External links
Delta's PM2.5 Energy Recovery Ventilator (ERV)
http://www.engineeringtoolbox.com/heat-recovery-efficiency-d_201.html
Designing Dedicated Outdoor Air Systems, Stanley A. Mumma
http://www.lowkwh.com - energy recovery methods and publications
http://www.UltimateAir.com
Energy and Heat Recovery Ventilators (ERV/HRV)
Heat Recovery Ventilation TANGRA 

Ventilation
Heating, ventilation, and air conditioning
Low-energy building
Energy recovery

pl:Rekuperator